The 1947 Ohio State Buckeyes football team was an American football team that represented Ohio State University in the 1947 Big Nine Conference football season. In its first season under head coach Wes Fesler, the team compiled a 2–6–1 record (1–4–1 against conference opponents), finished last in the Big Nine, and was outscored by a total of 150 to 60.

Key players included Ollie Cline and Joe Whisler.

Schedule

Coaching staff
 Wes Fesler, head coach, first year

1948 NFL draftees
Five Ohio State players were selected in the 1948 NFL Draft, as follows:

References

Ohio State
Ohio State Buckeyes football seasons
Ohio State Buckeyes football